Charles Rew (30 September 1898 – 3 October 1972) was a British rower. He competed in the men's eight event at the 1924 Summer Olympics.

References

External links
 

1898 births
1972 deaths
British male rowers
Olympic rowers of Great Britain
Rowers at the 1924 Summer Olympics
People from Brentford